Miloš Jevđević (born 11 January 1981) is a Serbian footballer.

Career
Before coming to Fier, he played mostly in the Serbian Second League, being the only exceptions the last season with FK Javor Ivanjica that he played in 2002-03 in the First League of Serbia and Montenegro, and the first six months of 2007, that he spend with OFK Grbalj in the Montenegrin First League. Beside Javor, FK Timok, FK Radnički Niš, FK Napredak Kruševac, OFK Mladenovac, FK Sevojno, FK Novi Pazar and FK Inđija, are the other clubs in Serbia where he played.

References
 Profile and stats at Srbijafudbal
 Profile at Footballdatabase

1981 births
Living people
Serbian footballers
Serbian expatriate footballers
Association football midfielders
FK Bor players
FK Javor Ivanjica players
FK Timok players
FK Radnički Niš players
FK Napredak Kruševac players
OFK Mladenovac players
FK Sevojno players
FK Novi Pazar players
FK Inđija players
OFK Grbalj players
FK Kukësi players
KF Apolonia Fier players
Expatriate footballers in Albania
Serbian expatriate sportspeople in Albania